I Came Out of the Eighteenth Century is the 1942 autobiography of educator John Andrew Rice.

Bibliography

External links 

 Full text from the Internet Archive

1942 non-fiction books
English-language books
Harper & Brothers books
American autobiographies